This is a list of 135 species in Olesicampe, a genus of ichneumon wasps in the family Ichneumonidae.

Olesicampe species

 Olesicampe abnormis (Brischke, 1880) c g
 Olesicampe affinis (Parfitt, 1882) c g
 Olesicampe alaskensis (Ashmead, 1902) c g
 Olesicampe albispina (Cameron, 1886) c
 Olesicampe alboplica (Thomson, 1887) c g
 Olesicampe alpestris (Cameron, 1886) c g
 Olesicampe alpina (Strobl, 1904) c g
 Olesicampe annulata (Provancher, 1879) c g
 Olesicampe annulitarsis (Thomson, 1887) c g
 Olesicampe argentata (Gravenhorst, 1829) c g
 Olesicampe atypica (Viereck, 1925) c
 Olesicampe auctor (Gravenhorst, 1829) c g
 Olesicampe banffensis (Viereck, 1925) c g
 Olesicampe barbata (Provancher, 1886) c g
 Olesicampe basalis (Thomson, 1887) c g
 Olesicampe beginii (Ashmead, 1896) c g
 Olesicampe benefactor (Thomson, 1887) b
 Olesicampe bimaculata (Gravenhorst, 1829) c
 Olesicampe binotata (Thomson, 1887) c
 Olesicampe brachyura (Ashmead, 1890) c g
 Olesicampe breviseta (Brischke, 1880) c g
 Olesicampe buccata (Thomson, 1887) c g
 Olesicampe californica (Cresson, 1879) c g
 Olesicampe canaliculata (Gravenhorst, 1829) c g
 Olesicampe cavigena (Thomson, 1887) c g
 Olesicampe clandestina (Holmgren, 1860) c g
 Olesicampe clypearis (Brischke, 1880) c g
 Olesicampe cognata (Brischke, 1880) c
 Olesicampe confinis (Holmgren, 1858) c g
 Olesicampe conformis (Ratzeburg, 1848) c g
 Olesicampe conglomerata Hedwig, 1956 c g
 Olesicampe consobrina (Holmgren, 1860) c g
 Olesicampe consueta (Brues, 1910) c g
 Olesicampe crassitarsis (Thomson, 1887) c g
 Olesicampe curtigena (Thomson, 1887) c g
 Olesicampe cushmani (Viereck, 1926) c g
 Olesicampe decora (Viereck, 1925) c
 Olesicampe delicata (Viereck, 1925) c g
 Olesicampe dentata (Provancher, 1874) c g
 Olesicampe deposita (Brues, 1910) c g
 Olesicampe depressa (Brischke, 1880) c g
 Olesicampe egregia (Viereck, 1925) c
 Olesicampe elongata (Brischke, 1880) c g
 Olesicampe errans (Holmgren, 1860) c g
 Olesicampe erythropyga (Holmgren, 1860) c
 Olesicampe extrema (Holmgren, 1872) c g
 Olesicampe femorella (Thomson, 1887) c g
 Olesicampe flaveolata (de Stefani, 1894) c g
 Olesicampe flaviclypeus (Viereck, 1921) c g
 Olesicampe flavicornis (Thomson, 1887) c g
 Olesicampe flavifacies Kasparyan, 1976 c g
 Olesicampe flaviricta (Cresson, 1864) c g
 Olesicampe forticostata (Schmiedeknecht, 1909) c g
 Olesicampe fossata (Viereck, 1925) c g
 Olesicampe fulcrans (Thomson, 1887) c g
 Olesicampe fulviventris (Gmelin, 1790) c g
 Olesicampe gallicator (Aubert, 1964) c g
 Olesicampe genalis Horstmann & Yu, 1999 c g
 Olesicampe geniculata (Uchida, 1932) c
 Olesicampe geniculatae Quednau & Lim, 1983 c g
 Olesicampe geniculella (Thomson, 1887) c g
 Olesicampe genuicincta (Hedwig, 1932) c g
 Olesicampe gibba (Brischke, 1880) c g
 Olesicampe gracilipes (Thomson, 1887) c
 Olesicampe heterogaster (Thomson, 1887) c g
 Olesicampe illepida (Cresson, 1872) c g
 Olesicampe incompleta (Brischke, 1880) c g
 Olesicampe insidiator (Gravenhorst, 1829) c g
 Olesicampe johnsoni (Viereck, 1925) c g
 Olesicampe kincaidi (Davis, 1898) c g
 Olesicampe lata (Viereck, 1925) c
 Olesicampe laticeps (Brischke, 1880) c g
 Olesicampe longicornis (Brischke, 1880) c g
 Olesicampe longipes (Müller, 1776) c g
 Olesicampe lophyri (Riley, 1877) c g
 Olesicampe lucida Szepligeti, 1916 c g
 Olesicampe macellator (Thunberg, 1822) c g
 Olesicampe melanogaster (Thomson, 1887) c g
 Olesicampe mimetica (Viereck, 1925) c
 Olesicampe montezuma (Cameron, 1886) c
 Olesicampe monticola (Hedwig, 1938) c g
 Olesicampe nematicida (Viereck, 1925) c g
 Olesicampe nematorum (Tschek, 1871) c g
 Olesicampe nigricoxa (Thomson, 1887) c
 Olesicampe nigridorsis (Viereck, 1925) c g
 Olesicampe nigrifemur (Szépligeti, 1901) c g
 Olesicampe nigroplica (Thomson, 1887) c g
 Olesicampe obscura (Roman, 1923) c g
 Olesicampe obscuripes (Viereck, 1903) c g
 Olesicampe ocellata (Viereck, 1925) c
 Olesicampe pagana (Holmgren, 1860) c g
 Olesicampe pallidipes (Roman, 1926) c g
 Olesicampe paludicola (Holmgren, 1860) c g
 Olesicampe patellana (Thomson, 1887) c g
 Olesicampe patula (Viereck, 1925) c g
 Olesicampe peraffinis (Ashmead, 1890) c g
 Olesicampe peregrina (Brischke, 1880) c g
 Olesicampe petiolata (Viereck, 1925) c
 Olesicampe pikonemae Walley, 1942 c g
 Olesicampe plena (Brues, 1910) c g
 Olesicampe praecox (Holmgren, 1860) c g
 Olesicampe praeoccupator (Aubert, 1974) c g
 Olesicampe proterva (Brischke, 1880) c g
 Olesicampe prussica (Brischke, 1880) c g
 Olesicampe pteronideae (Rohwer, 1915) c g
 Olesicampe pubescens (Ratzeburg, 1844) c g
 Olesicampe punctitarsis (Thomson, 1887) c g
 Olesicampe radiella (Thomson, 1885) c g
 Olesicampe ratzeburgi (Tschek, 1871) c g
 Olesicampe retusa (Thomson, 1887) c g
 Olesicampe ruficornis (Provancher, 1875) c
 Olesicampe rugulosa (Brischke, 1880) c g
 Olesicampe sericea (Holmgren, 1856) c g
 Olesicampe signata (Brischke, 1880) c g
 Olesicampe sinuata (Thomson, 1887) c g
 Olesicampe sordidella (Holmgren, 1860) c g
 Olesicampe spireae (Thomson, 1887) c g
 Olesicampe sternella (Thomson, 1887) c g
 Olesicampe stigmatica (Brischke, 1880) c
 Olesicampe tarsata (Brischke, 1880) g
 Olesicampe tarsator (Thomson, 1887) c g
 Olesicampe tecta (Brues, 1910) c g
 Olesicampe terebrator Hinz, 1975 c g
 Olesicampe teutonum (Dalla Torre, 1901) c g
 Olesicampe thapsicola Seyrig, 1927 c g
 Olesicampe thoracica (Brischke, 1880) c g
 Olesicampe tianschanica (Kokujev, 1915) c g
 Olesicampe transiens (Ratzeburg, 1848) c g
 Olesicampe typica (Viereck, 1925) c g
 Olesicampe umbrata (Brischke, 1880) c
 Olesicampe vetula (Holmgren, 1860) c g
 Olesicampe vetusta (Brues, 1910) c g
 Olesicampe vexata (Holmgren, 1860) c g
 Olesicampe virginiensis (Viereck, 1921) c g
 Olesicampe vitripennis (Holmgren, 1860) c g

Data sources: i = ITIS, c = Catalogue of Life, g = GBIF, b = Bugguide.net

References

Olesicampe